The project to create the International Space Station required the utilization and/or construction of new and existing manufacturing facilities around the world, mostly in the United States and Europe. The agencies overseeing the manufacturing involved NASA, Roscosmos, the European Space Agency, JAXA, and the Canadian Space Agency. Hundreds of contractors working for the five space agencies were assigned the task of fabricating the modules, trusses, experiments and other hardware elements for the station.

The fact that the project involved the co-operation of sixteen countries working together created engineering challenges that had to be overcome: most notably the differences in language, culture and politics, but also engineering processes, management, measuring standards and communication; to ensure that all elements connect together and function according to plan. The ISS agreement program also called for the station components to be made highly durable and versatile — as it is intended to be used by astronauts indefinitely. A series of new engineering and manufacturing processes and equipment were developed, and shipments of steel, aluminium alloys and other materials were needed for the construction of the space station components.

History and planning
The project began as Space Station Freedom, a US only effort, but was long delayed by funding and technical problems. Following the initial 1980's authorization (with an intended ten year construction period) by Ronald Reagan, the Station Freedom concept was designed and renamed in the 1990s to reduce costs and expand international involvement. In 1993, the United States and Russia agreed to merge their separate space station plans into a single facility integrating their respective modules and incorporating contributions from the European Space Agency and Japan. In later months, an international agreement board recruited several more space agencies and companies to collaborate to the project. The International Organization for Standardization played a crucial role in unifying and overcoming different engineering methods (such as measurements and units), languages, standards and techniques to ensure quality, engineering communication and logistical management across all manufacturing activities of the station components.

Engineering designs
Engineering diagrams of various elements of the ISS, with annotations of various parts and systems on each module.

Technical blueprints

Manufacturing Information and Processes
List of factories and manufacturing processes used in the construction and fabrication of the International Space Station modular components:

Decommissioned Components are shown in gray.

Transportation

Once manufactured or fabricated sufficiently, most of the space station elements were transported by aircraft (usually the Airbus Beluga or the Antonov An-124) to the Kennedy Space Center Space Station Processing Facility for final manufacturing stages, checks and launch processing. Some elements arrived by ship at Port Canaveral.

Each module for aircraft transport was safely housed in a custom-designed shipping container with foam insulation and an outer shell of sheet metal, to protect it from damage and the elements. At their respective European, Russian and Japanese factories, the modules were transported to their nearest airport by road in their containers, loaded into the cargo aircraft and were flown to Kennedy Space Center's Shuttle Landing Facility for unloading and final transfers to the SSPF and or the Operations and Checkout Building in the KSC industrial area. The American and Canadian-built components such as the US lab, Node 1, Quest airlock, truss and solar array segments, and the Canadarm-2 were either flown by the Aero Spacelines Super Guppy to KSC, or transported by road and rail.

After final stages of manufacturing, systems testing and launch checkout, all ISS components are loaded into a payload transfer container in the shape of the Space Shuttle payload bay. This container safely carries the component in its launch configuration until it is hoisted vertically at the launch pad gantry for transfer to the Space Shuttle orbiter for launch and in-orbit assembly of the International Space Station.

Pre-launch processing and last stages of manufacturing
With the exception of all but one Russian-built module — Rassvet, all ISS components end up here at either one or both of these buildings at Kennedy Space Center.

Space Station Processing Facility
At the SSPF, ISS modules, trusses and solar arrays are prepped and made ready for launch. In this iconic building are two large 100,000 class clean work environment areas. Workers and engineers wear full non-contaminant clothing while working. Modules receive cleaning and polishing, and some areas are temporarily disassembled for the installation of cables, electrical systems and plumbing. Steel truss parts and module panels are assembled together with screws, bolts and connectors, some with insulation. In another area, shipments of spare materials are available for installation. International Standard Payload Rack frames are assembled and welded together, allowing the installation of instruments, machines and science experiment boxes to be fitted. Once racks are fully assembled, they are hoisted by a special manually operated robotic crane and carefully maneuvered into place inside the space station modules. Each rack weighs from 700 to 1,100 kg, and connect inside the module on special mounts with screws and latches.

Cargo bags for MPLM modules were filled with their cargo such as food packages, science experiments and other miscellaneous items on-site in the SSPF, and were loaded into the module by the same robotic crane and strapped in securely.

Operations and Checkout Building
Adjacent to the Space Station Processing Facility, the Operations and Checkout Building's spacecraft workshop is used for testing of the space station modules in a vacuum chamber to check for leaks which can be repaired on-site. Additionally, systems checking on various electrical elements and machines is conducted. Similar processing operations to the SSPF are conducted in this building if the SSPF area is full, or certain stages of preparation can only be done in the O&C.

See also

 Assembly of the International Space Station
 Origins of the International Space Station
 Space architecture
 Aerospace engineering
 Space manufacturing
 Space Station 3D – 2002 Canadian documentary

References

External links

ISS space agency websites
  Canadian Space Agency
  European Space Agency
  Centre national d'études spatiales (National Centre for Space Studies)
  German Aerospace Center
  Italian Space Agency
  Japan Aerospace Exploration Agency
  Russian Federal Space Agency
  National Aeronautics and Space Administration

Manufacturer websites
  S.P. Korolev Rocket and Space Corporation Energia
  Boeing - International Space Station
  Lockheed Martin Space Systems
  Thales Alenia Group
  Thales Aerospace UK
  BSM group (stainless steel supplier)
  MDA Space Missions
  Institute of Space and Astronautical Science
  Brazilian Space Agency
  Bigelow Aerospace
  Airbus space industries

International Space Station
Manufacturing
Space manufacturing
Industry in space